Ruben Droehnlé (born 11 July 1998) is a French professional footballer who plays as a center back  for Belgian club Virton.

Professional career
A youth product of Lille OSC, on 30 July 2018 Droehnlé was loaned to Orléans for the 2018–19 season. Droehnlé made his professional debut in a 5–1 Ligue 2 loss to FC Metz on 3 August 2018.
He returned to Lille from  Orléans in January 2019.

References

External links
 
 
 
 

1998 births
Living people
Footballers from Strasbourg
Association football fullbacks
French footballers
French expatriate footballers
France youth international footballers
Lille OSC players
US Orléans players
Ligue 2 players
Championnat National 2 players
Championnat National 3 players
Czech First League players
French expatriate sportspeople in the Czech Republic
French expatriate sportspeople in Belgium
Expatriate footballers in the Czech Republic
Expatriate footballers in Belgium